Canada Open or Canadian Open may refer to:

Canadian Open (golf), the Canadian Open of golf
Canadian Women's Open, a women's professional golf tournament managed by the Royal Canadian Golf Association
Canadian Open (tennis), the Canadian Open of tennis
Canadian Open (curling), the Canadian Open of curling
Canadian Open (badminton), the Canadian Open of badminton
Canadian Open (darts), a darts tournament that has been held annually since 1985
Canadian Open Chess Championship, the Canadian Open of chess
Canadian Open Mathematics Challenge, the Canadian Open of math
Joslin's Canadian Open, the Canadian Open of grappling
NWA Canadian Open Tag Team Championship, the Canadian Open of pro-wrestling on the NWA tour
Canadian Open Snooker Championship, the amateur Canadian snooker tournament
Canadian Open (snooker), the Canadian Open of snooker

See also
Open Canada Cup, a soccer championship
Canada Cup (disambiguation)
Canadian Championships (disambiguation)